Nicolò Tron (21 September 1685 – 31 January 1771) was an Italian politician, businessman and agronomist, citizen of the Republic of Venice.

A Venetian noble, Tron was a young ambassador of the Republic of Venice at the English court; back in Italy, he tried to import the technological and organizational innovations seen abroad, founding the Schio woolen mill, organizing his agricultural estates with modern criteria and activating himself in using his political influence to favor and encourage his own Venetian businesses.

Life 

He was born in 1685 in Padua from a noble Venetian family, descending from the homonym doge of Venice lived two centuries before. He attended the Nobles board of Parma and when he was young he began the political career as a Savio agli Ordini, the first senatorial rule which a young patrician could aspire. In 1711 Nicolò married Chiara Grimani of Francesco, one of the most beautiful ladies of the time according to contemporaries. Within a year, at 3 October 1712, she gave him his first-born son Andrea, which in turn would begin a brilliant political career, becoming the so-called "paròn del Senato" ("Master of the Senate").

Ambassador in London 
In the same year, at 10 December, Nicolò Tron was appointed as ambassador to the Queen Anne of Great Britain. The task entrusted to him was to seek support from the British court in the wars that the Serenissima was leading against the Ottoman Empire. Tron came in London one year and half later, in June 1714. In the meantime, Queen Anne was succeeded by George I. To the court environment, however Tron preferred to be associated to scientists and mathematicians, such as Isaac Newton, who appointed him Fellow of the Royal Society, and John Theophilus Desaguliers, French mathematician and physicist who founded on 14 June 1714 the Grand Lodge, or the modern masonry, and entrepreneurs such as Benjamin Berck, a famous panni-lani manufacturer who showed him the most modern techniques used in England for such of manufactures. The government of Venice was not particularly pleased for the life his ambassador was conducting, and after sending him some letters recalling his duties, he decided to support him with a sort of lieutenant, a knight Giacomo Querini, whose presence was accepted and endured from Tron without any particular problem.

At the end of his reign, King George awarded Tron with knighthood in his newly minted Order of St. George, but he didn't grant Venice the military support it wanted against the Ottomans: England tended its commercial interests with the Turks, rather than waging war on them; and the ambassador Tron likely had not insisted enough. On the other hand, thanks to the friendship he had established with the Spanish ambassador, Tron obtained from him a contingent of six ships.

Return to homeland

Once returned in Venice during the summer of 1717, Nicolò Tron brought with him technicians and machines to spread the technical and scientific that he had seen in England. The activity that involve him the most was the creation of woolen mill in Schio, but he was active also in the reorganization of him land holdings in Anguillara e other.

In England had had way to see the first hydraulic steam pumps achieved by Thomas Savery since 1698 and perfected by Thomas Newcomen and Denis Papin, machines for sale since 1712. The technology was still rudimentary and few efficient, but Tron understood their importance and he had made English technicians come in Italy to recreate that machine in his rural hold in Anguillara Veneta, in order to reclaim marshy areas. The company didn't have the hoped success, also for the death of an Englishman and the defection of another one. But this didn't prevent to Tron to create identical machines in the hills around Schio, in areas call Tretto, to use them on the drainage of water in the mines of kaolin and carbon.

This technology probably was too much immature to show economically valid results, so it remained an experiment without sequel confined in the two cited locations. However, it was the first time that these machines were processed outside of English borders.

Around these mines, and probably around steam machines installed, worked also James Stirling, called "the Venetian", a Scottish mathematician well known in England, escaped from England because of jacobite persecutions. He found shelter in Italy thanks to Tron. Stirling dedicated to Tron his treaty Lineae tertii ordinis Newtonianæ. Stirling, like Tron, hoped to have the Mathematics chair at the University of Padua. This didn't happen, probably because people that followed Leibniz's theory were considered better than Newton's one. We only know that Stirling visited the university once on 25 March 1721.

Wool mills in Schio and Follina

The most important work in the life of Tron was certainly the foundation of the Tron wool mill in the town of Schio. As soon as he returned home at the end of his mandate as ambassador, the new knight attempted to import technologies and methods into the city of Venice. Here, however, he found the clear opposition of the woolen corporations, which led him to turn his attention and his investments elsewhere. So he chose to build his factory in Schio: this municipality had recently (1701) obtained from Vicenza the permission to produce the so-called high cloths, that is the finest fabrics and those intended for export. Here in 1718 Tron found an evolving environment, where corporations were not as powerful as in Venice or Padua, with large, specialized and low-cost labor. He rented a laboratory with annexed land, had 9 English technicians arrive with families in tow, he began the production of fine and very fine fabrics with new weaving, dyeing and raw material use technologies. With a behavior which we would define from other times, he, at least initially, left the door of his company open so that the other companies in the area would also take vision and awareness of new technologies. In a few years his company had 26 looms, produced 300 pieces a year and employed 600 people.

Also to avoid the Schio woolen mill crisis, in 1749 Tron acquired in company with the German Georg Stahl, who became its director, the historical woolen mill of Follina, 
thriving company of considerable size in the late 1600s, but in a deep crisis in the mid-1700s. As was the case for Schio, he introduced new processes, the londrine seconde, brought in foreign technicians and employed new technologies, and within a few years the factory employed a thousand people, becoming one of the largest factories in Italy. From 1766 he worked first in the Schio woolen mill and later in the Follina mill, the Frenchman Jean Pierre Douarche, who introduced the flying shuttle invented by John Kay, which halved the labor required for weaving.

This huge development did not last long: in the following years the production decreased, and from 1726 Tron entrusted the management of the company, also sharing the property.
The reasons of this crisis were studied a lot and can be listed as:

difficulty in trading new products, which costs were not competitive as some fabrics from other countries, like some Eastern country;
Tron did not managed directly the company, entrusting its management to third parts;
problems in the management of the workers, which wer composed by part-time workers that also worked in the country; this made quality controls harder;
the competition not only from abroad trades, but also from little factories in the neighborhood, that had learned quickly the technological innovations and hired the best workers.

Political activity

Nicolò Tron was mostly known, at his time, as a politician involved in the economy and finance of the Republic of Venice, for his peers. In particular, in 1726, he was elected adviser at the Mercanzia. In 1737 he was nominated Capitain of Padua and from 1739 to 1741 he was in charge as General Superintendent in the Homeland of Friuli. In his political actions, he tried mostly to favor Venetian businesses against the overwhelming competition of goods from abroad.

He died in Venice in 1771.

Heritage

Among the many activities of Nicolò Tron, the most important was his textile industry in Schio.
After Tron's death, his propriety was shared with Francesco Rubini, a former worker who became a business owner; after five years he bought the inherited part of Francesco Tron (son of Nicolò), and at the end of the century he led the industry to a new era of prosperity. After that, and after other evens and ownership pasteures, the business was owned by Alessandro Rossi, the founder of Lanerossi, one of the major textile industries in the world in the second half of the 18th century.

Dedications 

 In Padua, in the Prato della Valle big square, a statue was dedicated to him. He is represented with a cornucopia on his feet, that can be related to the abundance of the trade.
 In Schio a bust was dedicated to him and it has been placed on the front of palazzo Toaldi Capra, which until 1980 was called "Palazzo Tron".
 Again in Schio, another bust made of earthenware decorates the front of Jacquard theater, located near the place where Tron's factory used to be many years ago.
 In Schio also a Liceo scientifico (High School) and a road were called after him.

Variations of his name 
The name Nicolò Tron is reported in this way in the documents of him years and in most of the researches of contemporary historians.
In the monument in Prato della Valle, Padua, and in the Schio's bust the name has been Latinized and declined to the dative: Nicolao Trono.
In some contemporary studies (see also the references) the name is italianated doubling the "c" letter: Niccolò Tron.
In the Royal Society archive, or at least in the one reported on the official site, the name lose the accent and the surname takes an "i": Troni Nicolo.

See also 
Tron family
Schio
James Stirling (mathematician)

References

Sources
 Pio Bertoli, Edoardo Ghiotto. La fabbrica di panni alti di Nicolò Tron a Schio: note di storia e archeologia industriale, stampa SAFIGRAF, Pievebelvicino, 1985.
 Giovanni Luigi Fontana. L'industria laniera scledense da Niccolò Tron ad Alessandro Rossi, Edizioni di storia e letteratura, 1985, Roma, pp. 91–97.
 Giuliano Galletti, Nicolò Tron e l'uso del 'calcolo aritmetico-politico' nella Venezia di metà Settecento, in Studi veneziani 1988, 1989, Giardini, Pisa,pp261–296.
 Edoardo Ghiotto, Le ultime volontà di Nicolò Tron, in Numero Unico Schio 1981, 1981, pp. 111–114.
 Francesco Griselini, Elogio alla memoria del fu nobile uomo Nicolò Tron cavaliere e senatore della Serenissima Repubblica di Venezia, in Giornale d'Italia, 11 e 18 aprile 1772, vol. VIII, pp. 329–342.
 Giuseppe Gullino, L'anomala ambasceria inglese di Nicolò Tron (1714–1717) e l'introduzione della macchina a vapore in Italia, in Non uno itinere : studi storici offerti dagli allievi a Federico Seneca, 1993, Venezia, pp. 186–207.
 Giuseppe Gullino, Jacopo Linussio, Nicolò Tron ed una possibile manovra di politica economica agli inizi della protoindustria veneta, in Chiesa societa e Stato a Venezia, miscellanea di studi in onore di Silvio Trentin, Venezia, 1994, pp. 197–206.
 Walter Panciera, A Follina, da Schio e dall'Europa: la compagnia Tron – Stahl, ne I lanifici di Follina. Economia, società e lavoro tra medioevo ed età  contemporanea, a c. di D. Gasparini e W. Panciera, Cierre Edizioni, Verona, 2000, pp. 161–177.
 Walter Panciera, L'Arte matrice. I lanifici della Repubblica di Venezia nei secoli XVII e XVIII, Canova Editore, Fondazione Benetton Studi Ricerche, Treviso, 1996.
 Walter Panciera, Vent'anni di bilanci di un'impresa laniera nel secondo Settecento, in Studi Veneziani, n.s., 19, 1990, pp. 125–170.
 Pio Bertoli, Edoardo Ghiotto, La Fabbrica di Nicolò Tron. Una rettifica ed una ipotesi, Schio numero unico : pubblicazione scledense, fascicolo 1 (2005),  P. 96-97 : ill.

Further readings
 Giancarlo Basso, "Rustego" innovatore, Università degli Studi di Padova, tesi di laurea, relatore Giuseppe Gullino, Padova : s.n., 2012.
 Walter Panciera, I lanifici dell'alto vicentino nel XVIII secolo, Associazione Industriali della Provincia di Vicenza, Vicenza 1988.
 Walter Panciera, Vent'anni di bilanci di un'impresa laniera nel secondo Settecento , in Studi Veneziani, n.s., 19 (1990), pp. 125–170.
 , Nicolò Tron e le sue monete : 1471–1473, Milano, Cogliati, 1901.

Republic of Venice nobility
Italian businesspeople
Italian agronomists
18th-century Italian politicians
Ambassadors of the Republic of Venice
1685 births
1771 deaths
Nicolo
Schio
Fellows of the Royal Society